Gregor Samsa is an American band from Virginia, United States, formed in 2000 and fronted by Champ Bennett. It takes its name from the main character of Franz Kafka's novella The Metamorphosis.

The band's sound, although rooted in the post-rock genre, differs from that of other bands in the genre in that it employs dual vocals by Bennett and Nikki King, a feature which relates them to the shoegazing and slowcore genres. Gregor Samsa has stated on its website that "the early history of the group has been lost in a wash of noise, strange beeps, and outright lies”.

Reviews of their album compared it to acts such as Brian Eno, Sigur Rós, Múm,  Godspeed You! Black Emperor, and Low.

In support of its latest release, the band played twenty-one eastern US venues in March before then venturing a 23-date tour of the United Kingdom, France, Luxembourg, and Germany during April. Historically, the band has chosen to tour and perform alongside a wide array bands and genres including Spokane, Kayo Dot, Barzin, Part Chimp, Calla, Engine Down, Isis, Pelican, Explosions in the Sky, Interpol, and many others.

The band completed their most recent album, Rest, in late 2007 and released it in April 2008.

Current members
Champ Bennett - guitar, vocals, piano
Billy Bennett - drums, video, samples
Nikki King - Rhodes piano, keyboard, vocals
Jeremiah Klinger - guitar, baritone guitar, clarinet, theremin
Cory Bise - bass guitar
Bobby Donne - Synth
Mike Ashley - drums
Mia Matsumiya - violin

Past members and contributors 
Brandon Evans - guitar,  keyboard, lap steel guitar
Jason LaFerrera - bass guitar
Earl Yevak - drums
Bobby Donne - bass guitar
Rick Alverson - guitar
Jason Wood - bass guitar
Eric Yevak - guitar
Amber Blankenship - cello, violin
Jon Sullivan - double bass
Nick Wurz - bass guitar (sometimes played with a bow)
Nathan Altice - guitar, keyboard
Tony Thaxton - drums
Toby Driver - clarinet and vibraphone

Discography

Albums
55:12 (CDLP 2006)
Rest (CDLP 2008)
Over Air (CD 2009)

EPs
Gregor Samsa (CDEP 2002)
27:36 (CDEP 2003)
27:36+2dot (LP 2004)

Splits
Split with The Silent Type (2001)
Split with Red Sparowes (2005)

References

External links
MySpace Profile
Press Highlights for 55:12
Last.FM Profile
Discography @ Discogs.com
Kennedy Center Performance

Rock music groups from Virginia
American shoegaze musical groups
American post-rock groups
Musical groups established in 2000